Jovan Andrevski is a Macedonian lieutenant general who served as the Chief of General Staff of the Army of the Republic of Macedonia (2000-2001). He resigned from his position during the 2001 insurgency in Macedonia, citing low morale and military campaign failures as the reason for it.

References 

Living people
Army of North Macedonia personnel
Year of birth missing (living people)